Sonam Khan (born Bakhtavar Khan) is an Indian actress and former model known for her works in Bollywood, and Telugu cinema.  She is the niece of actor Raza Murad and granddaughter of veteran actor Murad. She was paired with actors such as   Govinda (actor), Chunky Pandey,Chiranjeevi, and Naseeruddin Shah. Some of her notable films include Mitti Aur Sona, Aakhri Ghulam, Lashkar, Kroadh, Kodama Simham, Ajooba and Vishwatma. She appeared in over 30 films during 1988 through to 1994.

Career
Sonam was named by her parents (Mushir Khan - father and Talat Khan- Mother) as "Bakhtavar". "Sonam" is her screen-name, which is reportedly coined by Yash Chopra to be more marketable in the Indian film industry. She first entered into the Bollywood industry after being launched by Yash Chopra in the 1988 film Vijay. She shot to fame with the 1989 film Tridev where the popular song Oye Oye...Tirchi Topi Wale was picturised on her and established her as a sex symbol.

Personal life
In 1991, Sonam married director Rajiv Rai, who had directed her in two very successful films, Tridev and Vishwatma. Rajiv was the son of successful film producer Gulshan Rai, founder of the banner Trimurti Films. Whereas Sonam was a Muslim, Rajiv and his family were Hindus from Punjab. After marriage, Sonam quit acting and devoted herself to her family. The couple soon had a son, Gaurav Rai. However they later divorced.

During the period when bollywood was in the grip of the underworld mafia, Sonam came under pressure from gangster Abu Salem, who had previously had some dealings with her. In 1997, she had to leave India with her husband and son after an attempt was made on her husband's life by gunmen working for organized crime leader Abu Salem. The couple moved initially to Los Angeles and then settled in Switzerland for nearly two decades. However, the marriage deteriorated because of the troubles being faced by them from the underworld, and professional frustrations which both of them underwent because they could not pursue their respective careers in India. In 2016, after 15 years of separation, Sonam and Rajiv Rai finally divorced.

Filmography

References

External links

Year of birth missing (living people)
Living people
Actresses in Telugu cinema
Indian female models
Indian film actresses
Actresses in Hindi cinema
Indian expatriates in the United States
Actresses from Mumbai
20th-century Indian actresses